Do Raha is a 1971 Hindi-language drama film. The film stars Anil Dhawan, Radha Saluja, Shatrughan Sinha.

The film was remade in Tamil as Aval (1972).

Cast 
Anil Dhawan as Ravindra Kumar Bharti 
Radha Saluja as Geeta  
Shatrughan Sinha (Special Appearance)
Iftekhar as Thakur
Roopesh Kumar as Naveen
Rakesh Pandey 
Dinesh Hingoo as Banwari 
Leela Mishra as Laxmi

Music 
All songs were written by Indeevar.

References

External links 
 

1971 films
Films scored by Sapan-Jagmohan
1970s Hindi-language films
1970s erotic drama films
Indian erotic drama films
Hindi films remade in other languages
1971 drama films